His Majesty's Inspectorate of Probation (HMIP) is a statutory body and independent UK inspectorate funded by the Ministry of Justice, formed in 1936.

Role and functions
HMIP reports to the Secretary of State for Justice on the effectiveness of the arrangements for and discharge of work done on individual offenders to reduce their likelihood of offending or risk of serious harm. Historically, HMIP has inspected the work of the National Probation Service and from 2003 Youth Offending Teams, but since the Offender Management Act 2007 it has a brief to supervise more widely to reflect new arrangements by which probation services could be provided by other bodies.

HMIP also works to improve the performance of probation organisations by providing a range of advice; and to provide advice on good practice to ministers, officials, managers and practitioners.

Much of the work of the Inspectorate is concerned with the production of inspection reports of two sorts: inspections of individual probation providers; and thematic reports on the handling of aspects of probation work such as race equality, or drug treatment orders. The inspectorate has also published a number of reports on effective and evidence-based practice.

History
The Probation of Offenders Act 1907 granted the  Magistrates’ Courts the power to appoint probation officers.

A Departmental Committee to examine to role of social services in courts of summary jurisdiction was set up in 1934. When it reported in 1936 the first HM Inspector of Probation was appointed.

In earlier years the inspectorate was greatly concerned with the development of probation services in the UK, including the training of suitable staff, the organisation of probation areas, the creation of supervisory posts, and the accreditation of holders of those posts. As probation boards and areas matured, some HMIP functions such as training and accreditation were ceded to areas or other providers, and increased emphasis was put on inspection and the making of recommendations for improvement.

The Inspectorate existed as a Home Office function until placed on a statutory footing by the Criminal Justice Act 1991. The Inspectorate was hosted and funded by the Home Office until 2007, when its funding and hosting was moved to the new Ministry of Justice.

The role of HMIP has changed over its history to meet the needs of the time.

In 2014, HMIP had a staff of around 35 inspectors and 15 support staff and a budget of circa £3.5M.

Chief Inspectors of Probation
1936-1949 No Chief Inspector
1949-1972 Finlay MacRae (title of Principal Probation Inspector)
1972-1980 Mike Hogan
1980-1985 Roy Taylor
1985-1988 Cliff Swann
1988-1992 Colin Thomas
1992-2001 Sir Graham Smith
2001-2004 Professor Rod Morgan
2004-2011 Andrew Bridges
2011-2014 Lynn Calderbank (interim)
2014-2015 Paul McDowell
2015-2016 Paul Wilson (interim)
2016-2019 Dame Glenys Stacey
2019-     Justin Russell

See also
His Majesty's Chief Inspector of Prisons
National Offender Management Service
Probation

References

External links
HMIP independent website
HMIP on the Justice.gov.uk website
History of HMIP from the Justice.gov.uk website

1936 establishments in the United Kingdom
Law enforcement in England and Wales
Penal system in the United Kingdom
Prison and correctional agencies